The Portugal national football "B" team is the secondary football team of Portugal. It is used primarily for youth footballers or uncapped footballers with a strong prospect for the main team.

Competition Records

Torneio Vale do Tejo 
2001 second place
2002 champions
2003 champions
2004 champions
2005 third place
2006 third place
2008 champions

References

European national B association football teams
B